A bazaar or souk, is a marketplace consisting of multiple small stalls or shops, and often they serve as a city's main marketplace.

The term bazaar originates from Persian, where it referred to a town's public market district.

The term souk ( suq,  shuq, Syriac: ܫܘܩܐ shuqa,  shuka, Spanish: zoco, also spelled souq, shuk, shooq, soq, esouk, succ, suk, sooq, suq, soek) is used in Western Asian, North African and some Horn African cities.

List of Bazaars in Palestine and Israel

See also
Khan el-Khalili
List of bazaars and souks

References 

Arab localities in Israel
Lists of buildings and structures in Israel
Food markets
Late modern history of Jerusalem
Tourist attractions in Jerusalem
Buildings and structures in Hebron
Buildings and structures in the West Bank